Dead Ringers is an upcoming American drama television series. It is based upon 1988 film of the same name by David Cronenberg. It is set to premiere on Amazon Prime Video on April 21, 2023.

Cast and characters

Main
 Rachel Weisz as Elliot and Beverly Mantle, twin gynecologists. These versions are gender-flipped versions of the characters previously portrayed by Jeremy Irons.
 Michael Chernus as Tom
 Poppy Liu as Greta
 Britne Oldford as Genevieve

Recurring
 Jeremy Shamos as Joseph
 Jennifer Ehle as Rebecca
 Emily Meade as Susan

Episodes

Production

Development
In August 2020, it was announced Amazon Prime Video had given a straight-to-series order to a television series based upon David Cronenberg's 1988 film Dead Ringers, with Annapurna Television set to produce, and Alice Birch set to serve as head writer and executive producer. Sean Durkin, Lauren Wolkstein and Karyn Kusama will direct episodes of the series.

Casting
Upon the initial announcement, it was revealed Rachel Weisz would star in the series. In July 2021, it was announced Michael Chernus had joined the cast as a series regular. In August 2021, it was announced Poppy Liu and Britne Oldford had joined the cast as series regulars, with Jeremy Shamos, Jennifer Ehle and Emily Meade set to recur.

Filming
Principal photography began by August 2021, in New York City.

Release
All six episodes of the series are scheduled to be released on April 21, 2023.

References

External links
 

2020s American drama television series
Television series by Amazon Studios
Amazon Prime Video original programming
Upcoming drama television series
Live action television shows based on films
English-language television shows